Yuliya Andreyevna Kondakova (born 4 December 1981 in Leningrad, Soviet Union) is a Russian hurdler. At the 2008 and 2012 Summer Olympics, she competed in the Women's 100 metres hurdles. Her personal bests are 12.73 in the 100 meters hurdles (set at the 2013 World Championships in Moscow) and 7.93 in the indoor 60 meters hurdles (2013).

In February 2019, the Court of Arbitration for Sport handed her a four-year ban for doping, starting from 1 February 2019. On appeal, her four-year ban was reduced to two years and nine months with all of her results from 17 July 2012 to 31 December 2014 disqualified.

International competitions

See also
List of doping cases in athletics
Doping at the Olympic Games

References

1981 births
Living people
Athletes from Saint Petersburg
Russian female hurdlers
Olympic female hurdlers
Olympic athletes of Russia
Athletes (track and field) at the 2008 Summer Olympics
Athletes (track and field) at the 2012 Summer Olympics
World Athletics Championships athletes for Russia
Doping cases in athletics
Russian sportspeople in doping cases